Oxycomanthus is a genus of crinoids belonging to the family Comatulidae.

Species
 Oxycomanthus bennetti (Müller, 1841)
 Oxycomanthus comanthipinna (Gislén, 1922)
 Oxycomanthus exilis Rowe, Hoggett, Birtles & Vail, 1986
 Oxycomanthus grandicalyx (Carpenter, 1882)
 Oxycomanthus intermedius (AH Clark, 1916)
 Oxycomanthus japonicus (Müller, 1841)
 Oxycomanthus mirus Rowe, Hoggett, Birtles & Vail, 1986
 Oxycomanthus muelleri Rowe, Hoggett, Birtles & Vail, 1986
 Oxycomanthus perplexum (HL Clark, 1916)
 Oxycomanthus pinguis (AH Clark, 1909)
 Oxycomanthus plectrophorum (HL Clark, 1916)
 Oxycomanthus solaster (AH Clark, 1907)

References
 WoRMS

Comatulidae
Crinoid genera